Aglaia grandis is a species of plant in the family Meliaceae. It is found in Indonesia, Malaysia, the Philippines, Thailand, and Vietnam.

References

grandis
Near threatened plants
Taxonomy articles created by Polbot